The Royal E. Robbins School is a historic school building at 58 Chestnut Street in Waltham, Massachusetts.  The two story brick Georgian Revival building was built in 1901, during a period of rapid growth on the city's South Side.  It is named for Royal E. Robbins, a major figure in the founding of the Waltham Watch Company, a major economic force in that area.  It is now a community center.

The building was listed on the National Register of Historic Places in 1989.

See also
National Register of Historic Places listings in Waltham, Massachusetts

References

School buildings on the National Register of Historic Places in Massachusetts
Colonial Revival architecture in Massachusetts
School buildings completed in 1901
National Register of Historic Places in Waltham, Massachusetts
1901 establishments in Massachusetts